Lake Cișmigiu is a lake in the center of Bucharest, Sector 1, in Cișmigiu Gardens.  The lake has a surface of 29.500 m², a length of 1.3 km, a width of 50 meters and a depth of 1–2 meters.  During winter the lake is dried artificially and a skate park is organized on the lake bed. Close to the Lake Cișmigiu in the Cișmigiu Gardens is the much smaller Lake Lebedelor, which is reserved for water birds.

History
The lake was formed from an old bifurcation of the Dâmbovița River and was known in the time of Matei Basarab as Balta lui Dura neguțătorul.

References

See also
List of lakes in Bucharest

Cismigiu